A referendum on councils and treasury was held in the United States Virgin Islands on 30 April 1953.  It was largely a repetition of the questions from the 1948 referendum.  The passage of all four questions in this referendum resulted in the 1954 Organic Act which governs relations with the United States of America to this day.

Results

Joint Parliament

Common Treasury

Popular Election of the Governor

Representative in US Congress

References

1953 referendums
Referendums in the United States Virgin Islands
1953 elections in the Caribbean
1953 in the United States Virgin Islands